Giuseppe Boncore (died 23 June 1687) was a Roman Catholic prelate who served as Bishop of Lavello (1652–1687).

Biography
On 13 May 1652, Giuseppe Boncore was appointed during the papacy of Pope Innocent X as Bishop of Lavello.
On 21 May 1652, he was consecrated bishop by Marcantonio Franciotti, Cardinal-Priest of Santa Maria della Pace, with Giambattista Spada, Titular Patriarch of Constantinople, and Giovanni Battista Buonacorsi, Bishop of Colle di Val d'Elsa, serving as co-consecrators. 
He served as Bishop of Lavello until his death on 23 June 1687.

References

External links and additional sources
 (Chronology of Bishops) 
 (Chronology of Bishops) 

17th-century Italian Roman Catholic bishops
Bishops appointed by Pope Innocent X
1687 deaths